The North Warrnambool Football Netball Club, nicknamed the Eagles, is an Australian rules football and netball club based near the regional city of Warrnambool, Victoria. The club teams currently compete in the Hampden Football Netball League, where the football squad has played since 1997.

History
The club was formed in 1986 with the merger of Grassmere and Bushfield clubs. The merged club was known as Northern Districts and competed in the Warrnambool District Football League until it transferred to the stronger Hampden league in 1997. Northern Districts won the 1994 premiership in the Warrnambool DFL and was runners-up in 1992.

A move to the Hampden Football Netball League and a name change to North Warrnambool,  the Eagles struggled for their first season, finishing last. Michael Kol was the first coach. The Eagles played in their first finals campaign since joining in 2011 in an Elimination Final against Terang Mortlake Football Club going down by only 2 points.

In 2012 the Eagles stock rose significantly finishing 3rd on the ladder overall and losing the Preliminary Final against Cobden Football Club by 52 points.

Notable players
David Haynes - West Coast Eagles Coach of North Warrnambool Eagles 2011 - Current
Billie Smedts - Geelong
Josh Corbett - ,

Notes

References

External links
 Facebook page

Australian rules football clubs in Victoria (Australia)
Sport in Warrnambool
1986 establishments in Australia
Netball teams in Victoria (Australia)